Orenburg Airlines or JSC Orenair was a Russian airline with its head office on the property of Orenburg Tsentralny Airport in Orenburg. It operated domestic passenger services and inclusive tour charters, as well as aerial work and special flights. Its main base was Orenburg Tsentralny Airport and it had hubs at Domodedovo and Simferopol International Airport.

History 
The airline was formed from the Aeroflot Orenburg Division, which was established in 1932. In 1992, it began to operate under the name Orenair. It was the first Russian domestic airline to introduce the hub system of connecting flights in Orenburg, providing a full service for transfer passengers, and was the first Russian domestic airline to introduce through air fares.

In 2010, Orenair was acquired by Aeroflot and was likely to engage in fleet modernization as a result of the merger. Orenair recently acquired Air Austral's B777-200ER F-ORUN, which Air Austral had been trying to sell for a year.

In April 2016, Aeroflot planned to merge Orenair and Donavia into Rossiya to form one larger airline based in Saint-Petersburg, Moscow and Rostov-On-Don. The former Orenair fleet will carry the Rossiya livery. On 26 May 2016, the airline's air operator's certificate was revoked after integration into Rossiya.

Fleet

Fleet at time of merger 
In April 2016, the entire Orenair fleet was assigned to Rossiya. The remaining Orenair fleet consisted of the following aircraft (as of December 2016 the remaining 777 was at Phoenix Goodyear Airport):

Previously operated 
As of August 2006 the airline also operated:
1 Yakovlev Yak-40
8 Tupolev Tu-134
4 Tupolev Tu-154B
1 Tupolev Tu-154M
4 Tupolev Tu-204-100
2 Boeing 737-500

Incidents 
On 10 February 2016, Orenair Flight 554 departing from Punta Cana International Airport to Domodedovo International Airport experienced an engine failure, which caused fire and smoke in the cabin. The aircraft returned to Punta Cana, without fatalities or injuries.

References

External links 

Official website

Defunct airlines of Russia
Former Aeroflot divisions
Airlines established in 1992
Airlines disestablished in 2016
1992 establishments in Russia
2016 disestablishments in Russia
Companies based in Orenburg Oblast